Ricardo Chibanga (Lourenço Marques, Mozambique, 8 November 1942 — Golegã, Portugal, 16 April 2019) was a Mozambican bullfighter and the first Bantu African bullfighter.

References

Mozambican bullfighters
Mozambican emigrants to Portugal
Sportspeople from Maputo
1942 births
2019 deaths